Chronicles of the Dead is the second and final studio album by Finnish Folk metal band Falchion. The band featured Korpiklaani member Juho Kauppinen on vocals and guitar and Matti Johansson on drums.

Track listing
All songs: lyrics written by Miikka Tulimäki, music written by Juho Kauppinen.

 Primitive Again - 5:26 	
 Chronicles of the Dead - 5:25 	
 Shadows in the Wasteland - 4:39 	
 Kingdom of Dust - 5:03 	
 Desert Breeze - 5:26 	
 Shades of Gray - 7:12 	
 Dying Dreams - 6:51 	
 Mayhem Machine (instrumental) - 2:49 	
 Evolution in Reverse - 4:56

Personnel
 Juho Kauppinen - vocals, guitars
 Matti Johansson - drums
 Janne Kielinen - bass
 Miikka Tulimäki - guitars

Additional personnel
 Tapani Siirtola - orchestral arrangements on tracks 6 and 9

External links 
 
 

2008 albums
Falchion (band) albums